National Route 373 is a national highway of Japan connecting Akō, Hyōgo and Tottori, Tottori in Japan, with a total length of 101.9 km (63.32 mi).

References

National highways in Japan
Roads in Hyōgo Prefecture
Roads in Okayama Prefecture
Roads in Tottori Prefecture